Uqayribat Subdistrict  is a Syrian nahiyah (subdistrict) located in Salamiyah District in Hama.  According to the Syria Central Bureau of Statistics (CBS), Uqayribat Subdistrict had a population of 21,004 in the 2004 census.

References 

Uqayribat
Salamiyah District